This is a list of crown corporations and agencies of the Government of British Columbia.

Crown corporations in BC are public-sector organizations established and funded by the Government of British Columbia to provide specialized goods and services to citizens. They operate at varying levels of government control, depending on how they are defined, funded, and the kinds of services they provide. In general, though they are technically owned by the government, they operate at arm’s length from the public service and the elected officials of the government.

Individually, every public sector organization in BC is assigned a ministry that is responsible for the organization. That minister is the primary link between the B.C. government and the organization and is held accountable to the government for the performance of the organization. The Crown Agencies and Board Resourcing Office (CABRO) is responsible for supporting the governance of these organizations as a whole.

Current organizations 
The following is a list of current Crown agencies and corporations in British Columbia .

Though BC Liquor Distribution Branch is not a crown corporation, it is required to comply within the requirements of a Crown agency in relation to its financial reporting, service plan, and mandate letter. LBD operates under the B.C. Minister of Finance. The LBD owns BC Cannabis Stores and BC Liquor Stores.

Though it partners with the RCMP and municipal police, the Organized Crime Agency of British Columbia is a completely independent and designated police agency within BC, and is therefore not a crown corporation.

Former organizations 
 BC Immigrant Investment Fund
BC Provincial Capital Commission
BC Railway Company (operations and assets now privatized with CN Rail, though, shell company still exists)
BC Transmission Corporation
British Columbia Utilities Commission
Community Social Services Employers' Association of BC
Credit Union Deposit Guarantee Corporation
Open Learning Agency
Private Career Training Institutions Agency
Trades Training Consortium of British Columbia

See also

 Crown Corporations of Canada

References

External links
 BC Crown Agencies and Board Resourcing Office